Tolicha Peak is a summit in the U.S. state of Nevada.

Tolicha is a name derived from the Yokutsan languages.

References

Mountains of Nye County, Nevada